Kaltenmühlbach is a  left tributary of the Waldnaab in the Upper Palatinate in Bavaria, Germany. It rises in the High Thaner Forest and flows to the Waldnaab.

Course
After only a few hundred meters, it becomes a little stream in the hamlet Altglashütte. After  it flows into a pond.

From the bifurcation of left flowing Silberbach, it divides again after a few kilometers, and some of the water flows back to the Kaltenmühlbach. The Silberbach flows directly into the Waldnaab.

After the Kaltenmühlbach has regenerated after its turn, it flows through a deep valley, where it grows by numerous creeks into a small river. After a few farms, it flows under the road 2172 (Plößberg - Bärnau), and then helps the fledgling Waldnaab flow.

Inflows
 Urtlbach

See also
List of rivers of Bavaria

References

Rivers of Bavaria
Rivers of the Upper Palatine Forest
Rivers of Germany